Meta ovalis, otherwise known as the cave orbweaver, is a species of long-jawed orb weaver in the spider family Tetragnathidae. It is found in the United States and Canada.

References

Tetragnathidae
Articles created by Qbugbot
Spiders described in 1933
Cave spiders
Spiders of Canada
Spiders of the United States